Cogliano is an Italian surname. Notable people with the surname include:

Andrew Cogliano (born 1987), Canadian ice hockey player
John Cogliano, American politician

Italian-language surnames